The Zhoucun–Zhangdian Campaign (周张战役), short for the Campaign of Zhou's Village (Zhou Cun, 周村) and Zhang's Hotel (Zhang Dian, 张店), consisted of two major battles and a series of smaller battles that followed, fought between the Communists and the Nationalists in Shandong during the Chinese Civil War in the post–World War II era. The outcome was a Communist victory.  This campaign is also called the Campaign at the Western Section of the Qingdao–Jinan Railway (胶济路西段战役).

Prelude
In the beginning of 1948, the Nationalists in Shandong were forced to adopt a new defensive posture to strengthen the defense of the Tianjin-Pukou Railway.  In February, 1948, the Nationalist Reorganized 12th Division guarding the western section of the Qingdao–Jinan Railway was redeployed to Yanzhou (兖州), and its original task was reassigned to the Nationalist Reorganized 32nd Division and other Nationalist units.  The Communists decided to deploy their 13th Column to threaten the Nationalists in Qingdao so that they could not reinforce Nationalists elsewhere, and to concentrate units from their 7th Column, 9th Column, Bohai Column, and units from the Communist central Shandong and Bohai military districts to launch an offensive in the regions of Zhou's Village and Zhang's Hotel to dislodge the Nationalists.

Order of battle
Defenders: Nationalist order of battle:
Army-sized Reorganized 12th Division
Army-sized Reorganized 32nd Division
Other units
Attackers: Communist order of battle:
Units from the 7th Column
Units from the 9th Column
Units from the Bohai Column
Units from the Bohai Military District
Units from the central Shandong Military District

Campaign
Units of the Communist 7th Column and 9th Column secretly marched westward from Ye (掖) County, and by March 8, 1948, they had regrouped in Guangrao (广饶).  On March 11, 1948, under the cover of heavy rain, the Communist 7th Column suddenly besieged the town of Zhang's Hotel before dawn. As the defenders attempted to break out westward, they fell into the trap set up by the waiting enemy and the entire Nationalist garrison was annihilated.  The next morning, the Nationalists abandoned their positions outside the town of Zhou's Village, but were caught up by the approaching Communist 9th Column, who immediately launched a surprise attack on the retreating Nationalists.  Taking advantage of the chaos, the Communists successfully penetrated into the town, and after an eighteen-hour-long fierce street fight, most of the Nationalist Reorganized 32nd Division was destroyed, with over 15,000 casualties, and the town fell.  The consecutive losses of two major battles completely demoralized the rest of the local Nationalist garrisons, who abandoned their positions around the two towns in a domino effect.  Capitalizing on this advantage, the Communist 7th Column took Zichuan and Zouping (邹平), annihilating the Nationalist garrisons and their reinforcements in the process.  Meanwhile, the Communist Bohai Column and units from the Communist central Shandong and Bohai Military Districts (Communist bases) also badly mauled their Nationalist opponents in a series of smaller battles that followed, and the campaign concluded on March 21, 1948, by which time the Communists had successfully linked up two previously separated and isolated bases.

Outcome
The Nationalists lost over 38,000 troops in this defeat, and the important Qingdao–Jinan railway transportation and communication line was severed.  Additionally, fourteen cities and towns had fallen into Communist hands, and the Communists were able to combine their two separate bases in central Shandong and the coastal region into a single larger one.

See also
List of battles of the Chinese Civil War
National Revolutionary Army
History of the People's Liberation Army
Chinese Civil War

References

General references

Zhu, Zongzhen and Wang, Chaoguang, Liberation War History, 1st Edition, Social Scientific Literary Publishing House in Beijing, 2000,  (set)
Zhang, Ping, History of the Liberation War, 1st Edition, Chinese Youth Publishing House in Beijing, 1987,  (pbk.)
Jie, Lifu, Records of the Liberation War: The Decisive Battle of Two Kinds of Fates, 1st Edition, Hebei People's Publishing House in Shijiazhuang, 1990,  (set)
Literary and Historical Research Committee of the Anhui Committee of the Chinese People's Political Consultative Conference, Liberation War, 1st Edition, Anhui People's Publishing House in Hefei, 1987, 
Li, Zuomin, Heroic Division and Iron Horse: Records of the Liberation War, 1st Edition, Chinese Communist Party History Publishing House in Beijing, 2004, 
Wang, Xingsheng, and Zhang, Jingshan, Chinese Liberation War, 1st Edition, People's Liberation Army Literature and Art Publishing House in Beijing, 2001,  (set)
Huang, Youlan, History of the Chinese People's Liberation War, 1st Edition, Archives Publishing House in Beijing, 1992, 
Liu Wusheng, From Yan'an to Beijing: A Collection of Military Records and Research Publications of Important Campaigns in the Liberation War, 1st Edition, Central Literary Publishing House in Beijing, 1993, 
Tang, Yilu and Bi, Jianzhong, History of Chinese People's Liberation Army in Chinese Liberation War, 1st Edition, Military Scientific Publishing House in Beijing, 1993 – 1997,  (Volum 1), 7800219615 (Volum 2), 7800219631 (Volum 3), 7801370937 (Volum 4), and 7801370953 (Volum 5)

Conflicts in 1948
Battles of the Chinese Civil War
1948 in China
Military history of Shandong